Matthew Wilkas (born April 20, 1978) is an American New York based theatre and film actor, playwright and reality television personality. He is best known for his lead role as Matt in the 2012 feature film Gayby.

Early life
He grew up in Camden, Maine, with his two sisters. When he was 12, his father died. He later went to Boston University on the theater program because they gave him a student-aid package. He later moved to Hartford, Connecticut, before moving to New York.

Career

Theatre
Wilkas co-wrote with American actor and playwright Mark Setlock titled Pageant Play, a satire about the world of child beauty pageants. The play was produced in July 2008 at the Berkshire Theatre Festival. and in 2012, he was in the stage production Spider-Man: Turn Off the Dark replacing main actor Matt Caplan. Wilkas has appeared on stage in a number of acts including Silence! The Musical, The Last Sunday in June, Far and Wide, The Pride etc. He has appeared in the Williamstown Theatre Festival, the Huntington Theatre Company, the Berkshire Theatre Festival, the Rattlestick Playwrights Theater, and The Sundance Theatre Institute, under the direction of Michael Greif, Anna D. Shapiro, Will Frears, Carolyn Cantor, Mark Brokaw, Nicholas Martin, and Trip Cullman. In 2019, Wilkas starred in Little Shop of Horrors as Dr. Orin Scrivello at the Pasadena Playhouse

Film and television
His television career started in 2003 with a token role in the TV series Hope & Faith followed by brief appearances in The New Twenty and Ugly Betty. After many small roles on television, in 2012, he had a lead role in the feature film Gayby which debuted at the South by Southwest (SXSW) festival. In the film, Matt a comic book store worker (played by Wilkas) and Jenn a yoga instructor (played by Jenn Harris), best friends from college, now single and in their thirties, in agreement with a pact they had made in their youth, decide to have a baby ("gayby") together, even though Jenn is straight and Matt is gay. In 2012, Wilkas and Harris co-won the Award for "Best Acting Ensemble: Feature" during the Ashland Independent Film Festival for their roles in Gayby. The film won a number of other festival awards, named one of the top ten independent films of 2012 by IndieWire, and nominated for an Independent Spirit Award. For his performance in the film, Wilkas was named one of Out magazine's "Out100" and one of the Los Angeles Outfest Film Festival's "Five in Focus".

In 2014, Wilkas appeared in Undateable, an American television sitcom that aired on NBC where he was cast as the character Brett, Justin Kearney's gay friend (pilot only). He also appeared in a number of shorts including This Bachelorette Party Sucks and Masc Only.

In 2017, he had a lead role in New York Is Dead, a series that he co-wrote and produced. As Felix, he co-stars with Gayby actress Jenn Harris. Also in 2017, he is appearing in a lead role as X in "Boy Culture: The Series", an episodic sequel to the original 2006 LGBT American drama film Boy Culture. A Kickstarter campaign was launched for the production. The series will also include Darryl Stephens (as Andrew), Matthew Crawford (as Chayce), as well as Stephen Guarino and singer Steve Grand.

Personal life
Matthew Wilkas is openly gay. From November 2015 to July 2019, Wilkas was in a relationship with freestyle skiing champion and Olympic athlete Gus Kenworthy. At the 2018 Winter Olympics, in Pyeongchang, South Korea, Wilkas kissed Kenworthy before his qualifying run in the men's slopestyle; the kiss was broadcast on live television and was lauded as being a significant moment in visibility of LGBT+ athletes.

Theatre

 2008: Pageant Play (co-written with Mark Setlock) debuting in the Berkshire Theatre Festival. Work published by Dramatist Play Services.
 2012: Spider-Man: Turn Off the Dark as Flash Thompson and understudying the character Peter Parker/Spider-Man (replacing main actor Matt Caplan)
 2017: The Pride in various roles,
 2019: Born To Win(co-written with Mark Setlock) premiered at the Celebration Theatre in L.A.
 2019: Little Shop of Horrors as Orin Scrivello at the Pasadena Playhouse in Pasadena, California.

Filmography

References

External links
Official website

American male stage actors
American male film actors
American male television actors
Living people
American LGBT artists
American gay actors
1978 births